Jan Andrzej Domarski (born 28 October 1946 in Rzeszów) is a Polish former footballer and bronze-medal winner in the 1974 World Cup tournament in Germany. He played in seventeen matches for the Poland national team and was a double-champion Stal Mielec. He is often noted for scoring a historic goal for the Polish national team on 17 October 1973 against England at Wembley Stadium in 57th minute during the final group qualifying match for the 1974 World Cup. The match ended in a 1–1, which allowed the Polish team to win the group and qualify for the 1974 World Cup. The team ultimately secured third place in the tournament. He was capped 17 times for Poland, scoring two goals.

He later coached Stal Rzeszów.

References

Living people
1946 births
People from Rzeszów
Sportspeople from Podkarpackie Voivodeship
Association football midfielders
Polish footballers
Poland international footballers
1974 FIFA World Cup players
Ligue 1 players
Stal Mielec players
Nîmes Olympique players
Stal Rzeszów players
Polish football managers
Stal Rzeszów managers